Barra de Carrasco is a residential neighbourhood and resort of Ciudad de la Costa in Canelones, Uruguay. Its name means "mouth of the Carrasco Creek".

Geography

Location
It is located adjacent to Carrasco, an eastern neighbourhood (barrio) of Montevideo, on the Río de la Plata coast.

Population
In 2011, Barra de Carrasco had population was 5,410.

Source: Instituto Nacional de Estadística de Uruguay

Street map

References

External links
INE map of Colonia Nicolich, Paso Carrasco, Carrasco Int.Airport, and parts of the municipality of Ciudad de la Costa (incl. Barra de Carrasco)

Ciudad de la Costa